Água Preta (Black Water) is a Brazilian municipality (city) in the state of Pernambuco.

Água Preta was founded as a district of the municipality of Rio Formoso in 10 de novembro 1809. It became an independent municipality on July 3, 1895. The Praieira revolt (1848-1849), which originated Recife, spread to Água Preta in its first year. Captain Pedro Ivo Veloso da Silveira (? - 1852) took refuge in the forests of Agua Preta after the defeat of his faction in Recife and organized a guerrilla resistance for two years before his surrender.

Geography

 State - Pernambuco
 Region - Zona da mata Pernambucana
 Boundaries - Ribeirão  (N); Barreiros and Alagoas state   (S);  Palmares, Xexéu and Joaquim Nabuco   (W);  Tamandaré and Gameleira   (E)
 Area - 
 Elevation - 
 Hydrography - Una and Sirinhaém Rivers
 Vegetation - Subperenifólia forest
 Climate - hot, tropical, and humid
 Annual average temperature - 25.2 c
 Distance to the capital (Recife) -

Economy

The main economic activities in Água Preta are based in agribusiness, especially plantations of sugarcane and cattle-keeping. The city's other main economy is the civil service.

Economic indicators

Economy by sector
2006

Health indicators

References

Municipalities in Pernambuco